Fissure of the nipple, colloquially referred to as "jogger's nipple", is a condition that is the result of chafing of one or both nipples. This can occur in both men and women during physical exercise such as long-distance running where there is prolonged friction between the nipple and clothing. The issue is also commonly seen in surfers who do not wear rash guards or wetsuits.

See also 
 Cracked nipple
 List of cutaneous conditions

References

External links 

Skin conditions resulting from physical factors
Breast diseases